Married People is an American television sitcom that aired on ABC as part of its 1990–91 schedule. It was a production of Sternin & Fraser Ink, Inc. in association with Columbia Pictures Television and aired between September 18, 1990 and March 16, 1991. Jay Thomas and Bess Armstrong led the ensemble cast.

Synopsis
The series follows three couples in different stages of their relationships who lived in the same building in New York City. Newlyweds Allen and Cindy Campbell (Chris Young and Megan Gallivan) were occupants of the third floor; he attended Columbia University while she supported them as a waitress.  On the second floor were the Meyers, Russell (Jay Thomas) and Elizabeth (Bess Armstrong).  Elizabeth was a lawyer while Russell was a free-lance writer and househusband, particularly after the birth of their son, Max.  Living on the ground floor were Nick and Olivia Williams (Ray Aranha and Barbara Montgomery), an older couple who were the building's owners (the building was in a gentrified area of Harlem, but often referred to by the street name "Central Park North").  Nick was an irascible traditionalist who constantly wondered why Russell didn't go out and get a "real" job and found Allen to be "too white" ("even for a white boy"), but was basically a good, decent man.

Married People was critically acclaimed but garnered low ratings, particularly after being continually pre-empted by ABC News providing coverage of the Persian Gulf War. The series was cancelled in March 1991, but rerun in August and September of that year just prior to the beginning of the 1991–92 schedule.

Episodes

Awards

References
Brooks, Tim and Marsh, Earle. The Complete Directory to Prime Time Network and Cable TV Shows 1946–Present

External links
  
 

1990 American television series debuts
1991 American television series endings
1990s American sitcoms
American Broadcasting Company original programming
English-language television shows
Television series by Sony Pictures Television
Television shows set in New York City